This is a list of mayors of Antwerp throughout history. Names of acting mayors are written in italic.

1500 

 1500 : Willem Draeck, Lord of Merksem. and Gillis de Schermere
 1501 : Willem Draeck, Lord of Merksem. and Gillis de Schermere
 1502 : Gillis van Berchem and Kosten van Halmale
 1503 : Hendrik van der Moelen and Gillis de Schermere
 1504 : Gillis van Berchem and Kosten van Halmale
 1505 : Kosten van Berchem  and Gillis de Schermere
 1506 : Arnold van Liere and Jan van de Werve
 1507 : Jan van Berchem and Willem Draeck
 1508 : Willem Draeck, Arnold de Buekelere and Jan van de Werve 
 1509 : Willem van Immerseele and Arnold van Liere
 1510 : Arnold van de Werve and Gillis van Berchem
1512:Arnold van Liere and Willem Draeck
1513: Willem Draeck and Arnold van Liere
1514: Jan van de Werve and Willem Draeck
1515: Gillis van Berchem and Arnold van Liere
1516-1517: Willem Draeck and Arnold van Liere
1518: Jan van de Werve, Willem Draeck and Filips de Buekeleren
1519: Peeter van der Moelen and Arnold van Liere
1520: Arnold van Liere and Willem Draeck
1521: Gerard van de Werve and Filips de Buekelere
1522: Willem Draeck and Arnold van Liere
1523: Arnold van de Werve and Arnold van Liere
1524: Willem Draeck and Kasper van Halmale
1525: Arnold van de Werve and Arnold van Liere
1526: Willem van Liere and Kasper van Halmale
1527: Arnold van Liere and Adriaan van Hertsen
1528: Kasper van Halmale and Arnold van Liere
1529: Gerard van de Werve, Arnold van Liere and Adriaan van Hertsen
1530: Willem van Liere and Adriaan van Hertsen
1531: Arnold van de Werve and Arnold Schoyte
1532: Arnold van de Werve, Willem van Liere and Lancelot van Ursel
1533: Lancelot van Ursel and Willem Draeck
1534: Cornelis van Spangen and Lancelot van Ursel
1535: Willem van Liere and Gabriel Triapain
1536: Cornelis van Spangen and Nikolaas van der Meeren
1537: Frans van der Dilft and Nikolaas van der Meeren
1538-1539: Cornelis van Spangen and Lancelot van Ursel
1540: Lancelot van Ursel and Frans van der Dilft
1541: Cornelis van Spangen and Jan van Crombah
1542: Lancelot van Ursel and Nikolaas de Schermere
1543: Willem van Halmale and Lancelot van Ursel
1544: Jan van Crombach and Lancelot van Ursel
1545: Lancelot van Ursel and Jan Scheyfve
1546: Michiel van der Heyden and Hendrik van Berchem
1547: Cornelis van Spangen and Lancelot van Ursel
1548: Lancelot van Ursel and Hendrik van Berchem
1549: Nikolaas van der Meeren and Jacob van Hertsen
1550: Nikolaas van der Meeren and Nikolaas de Schermere
1551-1552: Dirk van de Werve and Jacob Herisen
1553: Nikolaas van der Meeren and Jan Happaert
1554: Hendrik van Berchem and Dirk van de Werve
1555-1557: Antoon van Stralen and Nikolaas Rockox sr.
1558: Alvaro D'Almaras and Hendrik van Berchem
1559: Alvaro D'Almaras, Jan van Schoonhoven and Hendrik van Berchem
1560: Jan van Schoonhoven and Nikolaas Rockox sr.
1561: Antoon van Stralen and Hendrik van Berchem
1562-1563: Lancelot van Ursel and Nikolaas Rockox sr.
1564: Hendrik van Berchem and Jan van Schoonhoven
1565: Antoon van Stralen and Lancelot van Ursel
1566-1567: Hendrik van Berchem and Jacob van der Heyden
1568: Jan van Schoonhoven and Hendrik van Etten
1569-1570: Hendrik van Berchem and Jan Wolfaert
1571-1572: Lancelot van Ursel and Jan van der Meeren
1573: Lancelot van Ursel, Jan van Schoonhoven and Jan van der Meeren
1574-1575: Jan van Schoonhoven and Nikolaas Rockox I.
1576: Hendrik van Berchem, Jan van der Meeren and Jan Wolfaert
1577: Jan van Schoonhoven and Jan van Stralen
1578: Jan van Stralen and Willem de Vos
1579-1580: Jan Junius van Leefdale and Rutgeert van Leefdale
1581-1582: Filips van Schoonhoven and Peeter van Aelst
1583-1584: Filips van Marnix van Sint-Aldegonde and Jacob van Wachtendonck
1585-1587: Eduard van der Dilft and Adriaan van Heylwegen
1588: Jan Damant and Balten van Vlierden
1589-1590: Eduard van der Dilft and Karel Malineus
1591: Hendrik van Halmale and Adriaan van Heylwegen
1592-1593: Blasius de Bejar and Gillis Gerard
1594-1595: Eduard van der Dilft and Karel Malineus
1596-1597: Jacob Dassa and Hendrik van Etten
1598-1599: Blasius de Bejar and Hendrik van Halmale

1600 

 1600-1601: Jacob Dassa and Gilles de Mera
 1602: Eduard van der Dilft and Jan van Brecht
 1603: Nikolaas Rockox II. and Balten de Robiano
 1604: Jacob Dassa and Hendrik van Etten 
 1605: Nikolaas Rockox II. and Kasper Rovelasca 
 1606-1607: Blasius de Bejar and Hendrik van Etten 
 1608-1609: Nikolaas Rockox II. and Hendrik van Halmale 
 1610: Jacob Dassa and Gillis de Mera 
 1611: Nikolaas Rockox II and Hendrik van Etten 
 1612-1613: Blasius de Bejar and Gillis Gerardi 
 1614: Jacob Dassa and Jan Happaert 
 1615: Nikolaas Rockox II. and Hendrik van Etten 
 1616: Blasius de Bejar and Antoon van Berchem 
 1617: Nikolaas Rockox II. and Pauwel van Liere 
 1618: Jan Happaert and Hendrik van de Werve 
 1619: Lancelot Tseraerts and Frans de Schot 
 1620: Hendrik van Etten and Jan van Stembor 
 1621: Nikolaas Rockox II. and Karel de Mera 
 1622: Jan van Stembor and Robrecht Tucher 
 1623: Jan Happaert and Karel de Mera 
 1624: Engelbrecht van Oyenbrugge and Pauwel van Liere 
 1625: Nikolaas Rockox II. and Robrecht Tucher 
 1626: Robrecht Tucher and Frans Gallo de Salamanca 
 1627: Frans Gallo de Salamanca and Filips van Vlierden 
 1628-1630: Antoon Sivori and Robrecht Tucher 
 1631: Hendrik van Etten, Filips van Vlierden and Andries Gerardi 
 1632: Antoon Sivori and Robrecht Tucher 
 1633: Jan de Bejar and Karel de Santa Cruz 
 1634-1635: Robrecht Tucher and Jan Roose 
 1636: Hendrik van Etten and Karel de Santa Cruz 
 1637: Robrecht Tucher and Jan Roose 
 1638: Antoon Sivori and Karel de Santa Cruz 
 1639: Antoon Sivori, Karel de Santa Cruz and Jan Roose 
 1640: Jan Roose and Robrecht Tucher 
 1641: Jan Roose, Antoon Sivori and Robrecht Tucher 
 1642-1643: Antoon Sivori and Jacob van Buren 
 1644-1645: Gooris del Plano and Melchior Haeckx 
 1646-1647: Hendrik van Halmale and Antoon Sivori 
 1648: Gooris del Plano and Melchior Haeckx 
 1649-1650: Hendrik van Halmale and Alexander Goubau 
 1651: Filips Schoyte and Jacob van Buren 
 1652: Alexander Goubau, Gooris del Plano and Jacob van Buren 
 1653: Alexander Goubau and Jacob van Buren 
 1654: Hendrik van Halmale and Jan Snijers 
 1655: Floris van Berchem and Jan Snijers 
 1656: Frans Paschier van den Cruyce and Jan Snijers 
 1657-1658: Floris van Berchem and Gooris Martens 
 1659: Hendrik van Halmale and Gillis Martens 
 1660: Hendrik van Halmale and Jan van Weerden 
 1661: Jan Antoon Tucher and Jan van Weerden 
 1662: Jan Antoon Tucher and Gillis Martens 
 1663-1664: Hendrik van de Werve and Gillis Martens 
 1665: Hendrik van Halmale and Willem des Pommereaux 
 1666: Alexander Goubau and Gillis Martens 
 1667-1668: Hendrik van de Werve and Jan Snijers 
 1669: Hendrik van Halmale and Jan Baptist Greyns 
 1670-1671: Jan Antoon Tucher and Floris van Berchem 
 1672: Floris van Berchem and Jan Vecquemans 
 1673: Floris van Berchem and Jan Baptist Greyns 
 1674: Hendrik van Halmale and Jan Baptist Greyns 
 1675: Hendrik van de Werve and Filips Schoyte 
 1676-1677: Hendrik van Halmale and Librecht van den Hove 
 1678: Floris van Berchem and Jan Baptist Greyns 
 1679: Filips Frans de Varick and Filips Schoyte 
 1680: Floris van Berchem and Jan Baptist della Faille 
 1681: Jan Baptist Greyns and Nikolaas Jozef van Halmale 
 1682: Floris van Berchem and Jacob Antoon de Witte 
 1683: Nikolaas Jozef van Halmale and Jan Baptist Greyns 
 1684: Peeter Happaert and Jacob Antoon de Witte 
 1685: Nikolaas Jozef van Halmale and Paschier Ignatius van den Cruyce 
 1686: Jan Baptist Greyns and Gooris Martens 
 1687: Paschier Ignatius van den Cruyce and Jan Augustijn de Lannoy 
 1688: Nikolaas Jozef van Halmale and Theodoor Andries van Kessel 
 1689: Jan Baptist della Faille and Steven Cornelis Janssens 
 1690: Jan Augustijn de Lannoy and Leonel Stevens 
 1691: Eduard van Broeckhoven and Filips Rubens 
 1692-1693: Nikolaas Jozef van Halmale and Gooris Martens 
 1694: Paschier Ignatius van den Cruyce and Jan Augustijn de Lannoy 
 1695: Jan Karel van Hove and Gooris Martens 
 1696: Nikolaas Jozef van Halmale and Jan Jozef Vecquemans 
 1697: Eduard van Broeckhoven and Rochus van de Zande 
 1698: Paschier Ignatius van den Cruyce and Rochus van de Zande 
 1699: Paschier Ignatius van den Cruyce and Hendrik Comperis

1700s

1800s

United Kingdom of the Netherlands

Belgium

1800s

1900s

2000s

See also
 Timeline of Antwerp

References

 Info from the Liberaal Archief (in Dutch)

 
Antwerp